The Assembly of Christian Soldiers is a Christian Identity church that was established in 1971 by former Ku Klux Klansmen. At its peak, the church had approximately 3000 members organized into 16 congregations in Alabama, Georgia and Mississippi.

The Assembly of Christian Soldiers was incorporated in Alabama in August 1971 by Jessie L. Thrift, who was a former Grand Wizard of the Original Knights of the Ku Klux Klan, a schismatic KKK group. Among the members of the church were a number of other well-known KKK members. The church was best known for its 1970s program of using its tax-exempt donations to subsidize private, all-white segregated schools in the southeastern United States.

References
J. Gordon Melton (1993, 5th ed.). Encyclopedia of American Religions (Detroit: Gale) p. 937.
Richard Alan Pride (2002). The Political Use of Racial Narratives: School Desegregation in Mobile, Alabama, 1954–97 (Urbaba: University of Illinois Press) p. 117.
Chester L. Quarles (2004). Christian Identity: The Aryan American Bloodline Religion (Jefferson, N.C.: McFarland) p. 67Mobile Press'', 1971-08-02

Christian denominations founded in the United States
Christian Identity
Organizations based in Alabama
Christian organizations established in 1971
Ku Klux Klan organizations
Christian denominations established in the 20th century
Christian new religious movements